Danielle Taylor is a former association football player who represented New Zealand at international level.

Taylor made her Football Ferns début in a 0–0 draw with Korea Republic on 23 March 1996, and finished her international career with five caps and one goal to her credit.

References

1984 births
Living people
New Zealand women's association footballers
New Zealand women's international footballers
Women's association footballers not categorized by position